John David Backe (July 5, 1932 – October 22, 2015) was an American television executive who served as the President and CEO of CBS from 1977 until 1980. Previously a bomber pilot, Backe helped CBS return to number 1 in the late 1970s before being ousted by CBS' founder, William S. Paley. He died on October 22,2015, from heart failure. He was 83.

References

1932 births
2015 deaths
CBS chief executive officers
Presidents of CBS, Inc.
American television executives
Miami University alumni
Xavier University alumni